Canadian federal elections have provided the following results in the Eastern Townships.

Regional Profile
In 1988 and 1984 this area was nearly swept by the Progressive Conservatives under Brian Mulroney, winning all but one seat in 1988 (Shefford) and two in 1984 (Shefford and Richmond-Wolfe). Previously, the Tories only had one riding won in either 1979 or 1980, and that was in Missisquoi in 1979. The Social Credit party also won a seat here in 1979, in Beauce. 

By the following election in 1993, Mulroney had left office and support for the Tories all across Quebec moved to the Bloc Québécois.  Locally, the Bloc won all but two seats; the exceptions were in Beauce, which was won by former Conservative Gilles Bernier who ran as an independent, and in Sherbrooke, where Jean Charest was one of only two PC candidates to win in all of Canada. 

By 1997, Charest was PC leader and local candidates running on his coattails did well, resulting in a split between the Progressive Conservatives (four seats) the Bloc Québécois (three seats) and the Liberals (two seats). However, in 1998, Charest moved to provincial politics as leader of the Quebec Liberal Party (which is independent of the federal Liberals, despite the similarity of names), and without him local support for the PCs declined. 

By the 2000 election two of the PC members, David Price and Diane St-Jacques, had left the party and joined the federal Liberals. André Bachand remained with the PCs in 2000 and was re-elected, but declined to join the newly merged Conservatives and retired from politics in 2004. Traditional Bloc support in this region is concentrated in the northwest part, and in the Frontenac-Megantic region. Nonetheless, Bloc support weakened across the board here in 2006, primarily to the Conservatives.

In 2011, the New Democratic surge cost the Bloc six of its seven seats in the region; the two Conservatives retained their seats. Four years later, the Conservatives picked up a seat at the expense of the Bloc while Liberal support climbed enough for them to steal three seats from the New Democrats. 

In 2019, the Bloc regained popularity and the NDP was wiped out of the region with 2 losses to the Bloc and one to the Liberals.

Votes by party throughout time

2021 - 44th General Election

|-
| style="background-color:whitesmoke" |Beauce
|
|Philippe-Alexandre Langlois7,01812.32%
||
|Richard Lehoux27,51448.29%
|
|Solange Thibodeau8,64415.17%
|
|François Jacques-Côté1,6542.90%
|
|Andrzej Wisniowski4860.85%
|
|Maxime Bernier10,36218.19%
|
|Chantale Giguère1,0961.92%
|
|Sébastien Tanguay (Mar.)2060.36%
||
|Richard Lehoux
|-
|rowspan=3 style="background-color:whitesmoke" |Brome—Missisquoi(judicial recount terminated)
|rowspan=3 |
|rowspan=3 |Pascale St-Onge21,48834.96%
|rowspan=3 |
|rowspan=3 |Vincent Duhamel9,96116.20%
|rowspan=3 |
|rowspan=3 |Marilou Alarie21,29134.64%
|rowspan=3 |
|rowspan=3 |Andrew Panton3,8286.23%
|rowspan=3 |
|rowspan=3 |Michelle Corcos1,4662.38%
|rowspan=3 |
|rowspan=3 |Alexis Stogowski1,9823.22%
|rowspan=3 |
|rowspan=3 |Maryse Richard9611.56%
|
|Lawrence Cotton (VCP)216 0.35%
|rowspan=3 |
|rowspan=3 |Lyne Bessette$
|-
|
|Dany Desjardins (Ind.)145 0.24%
|-
|
|Susanne Lefebvre (CHP)133 0.22%
|-
| style="background-color:whitesmoke" |Compton—Stanstead
||
|Marie-Claude Bibeau21,18836.66%
|
|Pierre Tremblay10,08717.45%
|
|Nathalie Bresse17,68130.59%
|
|Geneva Allen4,2887.42%
|
|Sylvain Dodier1,6232.81%
|
|Yves Bourassa2,1673.75%
|
|Déitane Gendron5761.00%
|
|Sylvain Longpré (Ind.)1860.32%
||
|Marie-Claude Bibeau
|-
|rowspan=2 style="background-color:whitesmoke" |Drummond
|rowspan=2 |
|rowspan=2 |Mustapha Berri9,61418.78%
|rowspan=2 |
|rowspan=2 |Nathalie Clermont9,17917.93%
|rowspan=2 |
|rowspan=2 |Martin Champoux23,86646.62%
|rowspan=2 |
|rowspan=2 |François Choquette5,70911.15%
|rowspan=2 |
|rowspan=2 |
|rowspan=2 |
|rowspan=2 |
|rowspan=2 |
|rowspan=2 |Josée Joyal1,7283.38%
|
|Sylvain Marcoux (NA)419 0.82%
|rowspan=2 |
|rowspan=2 |Martin Champoux
|-
|
|Lucas Munger (Animal)674 1.32%
|-
| style="background-color:whitesmoke" |Mégantic—L'Érable
|
|Adam Lukofsky6,32913.63%
||
|Luc Berthold26,12156.26%
|
|Éric Labonté9,31820.07%
|
|Mathieu Boisvert1,3082.82%
|
|Emilie Hamel5921.28%
|
|Jonathan Gagnon1,6773.61%
|
|Real Pepin6801.46%
|
|Gloriane Blais (Ind.)4030.87%
||
|Luc Berthold
|-
| style="background-color:whitesmoke" |Richmond—Arthabaska
|
|Alexandre Desmarais8,54314.95%
||
|Alain Rayes28,51349.88%
|
|Diego Scalzo14,15024.76%
|
|Nataël Bureau2,5504.46%
|
|
|
|Nadine Fougeron2,0583.60%
|
|Louis Richard8971.57%
|
|Marjolaine Delisle (Rhino.)4480.78%
||
|Alain Rayes
|-
| style="background-color:whitesmoke" |Saint-Hyacinthe—Bagot
|
|Caroline-Joan Boucher12,03022.68%
|
|André Lepage7,16613.51%
||
|Simon-Pierre Savard-Tremblay25,16547.45%
|
|Brigitte Sansoucy6,17011.63%
|
|
|
|Sylvain Pariseau1,4452.72%
|
|Sébastien Desautels1,0551.99%
|
|
||
|Simon-Pierre Savard-Tremblay
|-
|rowspan=2 style="background-color:whitesmoke" |Shefford
|rowspan=2 |
|rowspan=2 |Pierre Breton19,96833.49%
|rowspan=2 |
|rowspan=2 |Céline Lalancette7,23412.13%
|rowspan=2 |
|rowspan=2 |Andréanne Larouche24,99741.92%
|rowspan=2 |
|rowspan=2 |Patrick Jasmin3,1735.32%
|rowspan=2 |
|rowspan=2 |Mathieu Morin1,0591.78%
|rowspan=2 |
|rowspan=2 |Gerda Schieder2,0733.48%
|rowspan=2 |
|rowspan=2 |Joël Lacroix5991.00%
|
|Jean-Philippe Beaudry-Graham (PIQ)239 0.40%
|rowspan=2 |
|rowspan=2 |Andréanne Larouche
|-
|
|Yannick Brisebois (Mar.)284 0.48%
|-
| style="background-color:whitesmoke" |Sherbrooke
||
|Élisabeth Brière21,83037.52%
|
|Andrea Winters7,49012.87%
|
|Ensaf Haidar16,84828.96%
|
|Marika Lalime8,10713.93%
|
|Marie-Clarisse Berger1,6702.87%
|
|Marcela Niculescu1,4532.50%
|
|Maxime Boivin7871.35%
|
|
||
|Élisabeth Brière
|}

2019 - 43rd General Election

2015 - 42nd General Election

2011 - 41st General Election

2008 - 40th General Election

2006 - 39th General Election

2004 - 38th General Election

Maps 

Beauce
Brome-Mississquoi
Compton-Stanstead
Drummond
Mégantic-L'Érable
Richmond-Arthabaska
Saint-Hyacinthe-Bagot
Shefford
Sherbrooke

2000 - 37th General Election

1997 - 36th General Election

1993 - 35th General Election

1988 - 34th General Election

1984 - 33rd General Election

References

Eastern Townships

fr:Élections fédérales canadiennes aux Cantons-de-l'Est et Centre-du-Québec